Miss Earth Indonesia is a discontinued beauty pageant from Indonesia that selected Indonesian representative in the Miss Earth pageant. The Miss Earth Indonesia competition was abolished in 2021 because of El John Pageant lost the franchise of Miss Earth and rebranded the pageant with Putri Bumi Indonesia From 2022, the licenseholder of Miss Earth pageant is PT. Mahakarya Duta Pesona Indonesia and make a new pageant named Putri Nusantara which Miss Earth Indonesia is selected as one of the winner from that pageant.

History

In 2007, Yayasan Putri Bumi Indonesia was established, The very first pageant was held in 2007 which focuses on environmental awareness, culture, and ecotourism. The winner represents Indonesia in the Miss Earth pageant, the first Miss Indonesia Earth winner, Artri Aldoranti Sulistyowati
represented Indonesia in Miss Earth 2007  pageant, was held on November 12, 2007 at the University of the Philippines Theater, inside the campus of the University of the Philippines Diliman in Quezon City, Philippines.

The slogan of the pageant is Beauty and Nature and was first organized by Yayasan Putri Bumi Indonesia from 2007 to 2012. In 2013, the national franchise for Indonesia was acquired by El John Pageants. Miss Earth Indonesia became a phenomenon Indonesian beauty pageant, as an annual national environmental-themed beauty pageant promoting environmental awareness in Indonesia. The grand winner represents Indonesia in the international Miss Earth pageant.

On November 4, 2008, the first Miss Earth Eco-Fashion Design Competition was launched by the Miss Earth Indonesia Foundation as an annual event for professional and non-professional fashion designers to come up with designs that are eco-friendly. The outfit designs are made from recyclable, natural materials, organic materials, and eco-chic designs or patterns that can be worn in everyday life or are runway worthy.

The reigning titleholders dedicate their year to promote specific projects and often address issues concerning the environment and other global challenges through school tours, tree planting activities, street campaigns, coastal clean ups, speaking engagements, shopping mall tours, media guesting, environmental fairs, storytelling programs to children, eco-fashion shows, and other environmental activities.

The Miss Earth winner is the spokesperson for the Miss Earth Indonesia Foundation, the United Nations Environment Programme (UNEP), and other environmental organizations. The Miss Earth Foundation also works with the environmental departments and ministries of participating countries, various private sectors and corporations, as well as the World Wildlife Foundation (WWF).

In 2022, El John Pageant lost the license of Miss Earth Pageant to PT. Mahakarya Duta Pesona Indonesia.

Gallery

Titleholders

Notes
(*) In 2010, Liza Elly Purnamasari withdrew, the second placed (Miss Air Indonesia 2010), (Jessica Aurelia Tji) competed at the Miss Earth 2010 in Nha Trang, Vietnam.
(**) The pageant was not held in 2011. the third placed (Miss Water Indonesia 2010), Inez Elodia Maharani was appointed to represent Indonesia at the Miss Earth 2011 in the Philippines.

International representations
Color key

Indonesia Representatives at Miss Earth
Below are the Indonesian representatives to the Miss Earth pageant according to the year in which they participated. The special awards received and their final placements in the aforementioned global beauty competition are also displayed.

Miss Eco Indonesia
Below are the Indonesian representative to the Miss Eco International pageant from Miss Earth Indonesia pageant according to the year in which they participated. The special awards received and their final placements in the aforementioned global beauty competition are also displayed.

Winners

Miss Earth Indonesia
Below are the winner of Miss Indonesia Earth and Miss Earth Indonesia Pageants.

Miss Air Indonesia

Miss Water Indonesia

Miss Fire Indonesia

Miss Eco Tourism Indonesia

Placements at International Pageants
The following are the placements of Miss Earth Indonesia/Miss Indonesia Earth titleholders for their participation from the past organizations at international pageants throughout the years.
 1 Placement at Miss Earth (2021). The highest placement is Monica Fransisca Antoinette Khonado as Top 20 Miss Earth 2021
 3 Placements at Miss Eco International (2017, 2019, and 2021). The highest placements are Annisa Ananda Nusyirwan (2017), Ratu Vashti Annisa (2019), and Intan Wisni Permatasari (2021) as Top 10 Miss Eco International.
 1 Placement at Miss Grand International (2014). The highest placement is Margenie Winarti as Top 10 Miss Grand International 2014
 1 Placement at Miss South East Asia Tourism Ambassadress (2015). The highest placement is Falentina Cotton as 2nd Runner-up Miss South East Asia Tourism Ambassadress 2015

Before Miss Earth Indonesia and Miss Indonesia Earth

Miss Earth Indonesia
Below are the Indonesia representatives in Miss Earth Beauty Pageant before Miss Earth Indonesia and Miss Indonesia Earth Pageants.

Miss Grand Indonesia
Before El John Pageant took the licence of Miss Grand International in 2014 and 2015, Miss Grand International licence was hold by Yayasan Puteri Indonesia (2013). The first ever Miss Grand Indonesia was Novia Indriani Mamuaja (3rd Runner-up Puteri Indonesia 2013). She competed in Miss Grand International 2013 when she got unplaced. Below are the Indonesian representative to the Miss Grand International pageant before Miss Earth Indonesia, and Miss Indonesia Earth pageants according to the year in which they participated. The special awards received and their final placements in the aforementioned global beauty competition are also displayed.

Miss Eco Indonesia
Below are the Indonesian representative to the Miss Eco International pageant before Miss Earth Indonesia and Miss Indonesia Earth pageants according to the year in which they participated. The special awards received and their final placements in the aforementioned global beauty competition are also displayed.

Miss Asia Pacific Indonesia

See also

Miss Earth
Putri Nusantara
Puteri Indonesia
Putri Bumi Indonesia
Puteri Indonesia Lingkungan
Puteri Indonesia Pariwisata
Miss Indonesia
Miss Grand Indonesia
Indonesia at major beauty pageants

References

External links
  Official website

Beauty pageants in Indonesia
Indonesian awards